Jackson Township is one of twelve townships in Jay County, Indiana, United States. As of the 2010 census, its population was 965 and it contained 318 housing units.

History
Jackson Township was organized in 1838.

Geography
The streams of Bear Creek, Dunkirk Drain, Haskin Run, Wall Run and Wolf Creek run through this township.

Unincorporated towns
 Kitt
 Poling
 West Liberty

Adjacent townships
 Hartford Township, Adams County (north)
 Wabash Township, Adams County (northeast)
 Bearcreek Township (east)
 Wayne Township (southeast)
 Greene Township (south)
 Penn Township (west)
 Nottingham Township, Wells County (northwest)

Cemeteries
The township contains one cemetery, Gravel Hill.

Major highways

References
 
 United States Census Bureau cartographic boundary files

External links
 Indiana Township Association
 United Township Association of Indiana

Townships in Jay County, Indiana
Townships in Indiana